Rajinder Singh may refer to:

 Maharaja Rajinder Singh of Patiala (1872–1900)
 Rajinder Singh (brigadier) (1899–1947), Maha Vir Chakra recipient, Jammu and Kashmir State Forces
 Rajinder Singh (cricketer) (born 1960), Indian cricketer
 Rajinder Singh (Skipping Sikh), British Indian health and fitness personality
 Rajinder Singh (spiritual master) (born 1946), Indian spiritual teacher
 Rajinder Singh (wrestler) (born 1954), Indian former wrestler
 Rajinder Singh Jr. (born 1959), Indian field hockey player

See also
 Rajinder Singh Bedi (1915–1984), Indian writer, screenwriter
 Rajinder Singh Rahelu (born 1973), Indian Paralympic powerlifter
 Rajinder Singh Rai, British musician professionally known as Panjabi MC
 Rajinder Singh Rana (born 1966), Indian politician
 Rajinder Singh Rawat (born 1940), Indian hockey player
 Rajinder Singh Sandhu (born 1945), Ugandan hockey player
 Rajinder Singh Sarkaria (1916–2007), Indian  Supreme Court  justice
 Rajinder Singh Sparrow (1911–1994), Maha Vir Chakra recipient, Indian Army